Tove Almqvist (born 5 January 1996) is a Swedish footballer midfielder who plays for Djurgårdens IF.

Honours

Club 
Linköpings FC
Winner
 Damallsvenskan (2): 2016, 2017
 Svenska Cupen (2): 2013–14, 2014–15

Runner-up
 Svenska Supercupen: 2015

International 
Sweden U19
Winner
 UEFA Women's Under-19 Championship: 2015

External links 
 
 
 
 

1996 births
Living people
Swedish women's footballers
Linköpings FC players
Damallsvenskan players
Women's association football midfielders
Vittsjö GIK players